Krsta Smiljanić (29 December 1868 – 14 May 1944) was a Serbian Army general (Kingdom of Yugoslavia), ban of the Zeta Banovina, and a senator in the Kingdom of Yugoslavia.

Biography 
Smiljanić was born in the Serbian village of Ljubiš on 28 December 1868 to Milosav and Vidosava Smiljanić. After graduating from high school, he enrolled in the Serbian Military Academy, which he graduated from in 1896.

During the First Balkan War he served under Serbian Marshal Radomir Putnik. The Serbian politician Nikola Pašić sent Smiljanić to peace talks in Bucharest after the Second Balkan War.

During World War I, he was the commander of Drina Division. He also took part in the Serbian army's retreat through Albania.

After the First World War, he became the commander of the Third Army Oblast and was ban of the Zeta Banovina (modern-day Montenegro and regions of Metohija, Herzegovina, and Sandžak). He was made a Yugoslav senator by King Alexander I in 1932.

Until the beginning of World War II he lived in Belgrade, but when the war started he moved back to Ljubiš. The German occupying forces placed him under house arrest, where he died in May 1944.

Sources 
 Генерал Крста Смиљанић
 Новка Илић: Ћенерал Крста Смиљанић
 Напредовања у служби Крсте Смиљанића

1868 births
1944 deaths
People from Čajetina
Serbian generals
Serbian nobility
Bans of the Kingdom of Yugoslavia
Burials at Belgrade New Cemetery